KWXM (102.3 FM, "Sold Gold & Blues") is an American radio station broadcasting an urban oldies music format. Licensed to Simsboro, Louisiana, United States, the station serves Ruston, Claiborne Parish, and surrounding areas.  The station is currently owned by William W. Brown, through licensee North Louisiana Broadcasting, Inc.

History
KWXM's frequency and ability to build a station was won by William Brown held in 2015.

External links

References

Radio stations in Ruston, Louisiana
Radio stations established in 2015
2015 establishments in Louisiana